Venus Williams defeated Lindsay Davenport in the final, 6–4, 7–5 to win the women's singles tennis title at the 2000 US Open. It was her second major singles title, and she became the second woman to win Wimbledon, the Olympics, and the US Open in the same season (after Steffi Graf in 1988).

Serena Williams was the defending champion, but was defeated in the quarterfinals by Davenport in a rematch of the previous year's semifinal.

This was the first major appearance for future French Open champion Francesca Schiavone.

Seeds

Qualifying

Draw

Finals

Top half

Section 1

Section 2

Section 3

Section 4

Bottom half

Section 5

Section 6

Section 7

Section 8

External links
 Draws (WTA)
2000 US Open – Women's draws and results at the International Tennis Federation

2000 US Open (tennis)
US Open (tennis) by year – Women's singles
2000 in women's tennis
2000 in American women's sports